Indian National League (abbreviated as the I. N. L.) is an Indian political party formed in 1994 under the leadership of the then Indian Union Muslim League leader Ebrahim Sulaiman Sait. The party is currently a member of the Communist Party of India Marxist-led Left Democratic Front in Kerala. Indian National League leader Ahamed Devarkovil, Member of the Legislative Assembly from Kozhikode South Constituency, serves as a minister in the Second Pinarayi Vijayan ministry.

P. M. A. Salam was the first National League candidate to get elected to the Kerala Assembly (2006). Indian National League was formally inducted into the Left Democratic Front in the late 2010s.

The partly currently has two factions (A. P. Abdul Wahab faction and Kasim Irikkur faction).

History 

 Indian National League was formed as a reaction to the continued alliance of Indian Union Muslim League with Indian National Congress post Babri Masjid Demolition.
 Opposition raised by several Communist Party of India Marxist leaders, who saw the National League as a communal party, ensured that the National League had to stay outside the Left Democratic Front for over two decades (1994 - 2018).
 The Indian National League mostly allied with the Communist Party of India Marxist unofficially in certain seats in the various Kerala Assembly elections between 1994 and 2018.
 Indian National League was associated with the United Democratic Front briefly in 2010-11.

Controversies 

 It was alleged that Indian National League had 'sold' the post of the member of Kerala Public Service Commission (KPSC) for Rs 40 lakh.

 Indian National League is known for its homophobic position.

References

Political parties in India
Political parties established in 1994
1994 establishments in India
Muslim League
Muslim League breakaway groups
Islam in Kerala